The Boca Raton Public Library consist of two library facilities serving the residents of the incorporated area of Boca Raton, Florida.  The City of Boca Raton, incorporated in 1925, is one of the largest and the southernmost city in Palm Beach County, Florida.

History 
The Woman's Club of Boca Raton started the community library in January, 1923.  The library was managed by a group of volunteers and the collection was developed from donations. It closed in 1926 and the collection was donated to a local elementary school.

In January, 1946, the community library reopened and its collection was housed in a building located on the Boca Raton Army Air Field. Severe damage from a hurricane forced the library to close again in 1947.

Another community library opened inside the city's town hall in 1948.  With the help of funding from the city, the library moved to the administration building of the Garden Apartments on West Palmetto Road in 1957. A new library building was completed in 1961 on NW 2nd Avenue, the location of the current Downtown Library. In 1966 this building was dedicated to the city and named the Boca Raton Public Library. The building subsequently underwent several renovations.

In 2003 Boca Raton voters approved a $19.8 million bond issue for the building of two new library buildings. The first building, located at 1501 Spanish River Boulevard, opened on January 26, 2008 and is known as the Spanish River Library and Community Center. The second building was constructed on Boca Raton Boulevard, a block north of the original Boca Raton Downtown Library, and opened in June 2013.

Facilities 
The Boca Raton Library has two locations to serve the residents of incorporated Boca Raton. The New Boca Raton Downtown Library (41,932 square feet) is at 400 N.W. Boca Raton Boulevard. The Spanish River Library and Community Center (40,940 square feet) is located at 1501 N.W. Spanish River Boulevard. The Spanish River Library, built in the Addison Mizner (1872-1933) style, additionally provides public space for meetings, gatherings, and events.  The hours of the library are posted on the library web site. The Old Downtown Library (21,400 square feet) was located at 200 N.W. Boca Raton Boulevard.

Groundbreaking for the new 41,932 square foot Boca Raton Downtown Library took place on April 24, 2012. The new library was designed by PGAL of Boca Raton in the Mediterranean architectural style of Addison Mizner (1872-1933). The library is built to meet Leadership in Energy and Environmental Design (LEED) Silver certification requirements.
The new Boca Raton Downtown Library was officially opened with a ribbon cutting ceremony and celebration on June 22, 2013.  The 42,000 square foot building features 70 public access computers, study rooms, and events space.

The Boca Raton Public Library opened the Discover Studio within the Downtown location in September 2015. The Studio was funded by the Friends of the Boca Raton Public Library. The Discover Studio utilizes a pop-up space model to teach emerging technologies, including 3D printing, photo and film editing, music production and audio podcasting. Classes are taught by qualified librarian instructors and outside expert instructors. The Discover Studio is a part of the library's involvement in community education. All classes are free with a valid library card.

Library advisors and supporters 
 The Friends of the Boca Raton Public Library, a 501(c) charity, is a volunteer and fundraising group dedicated to supporting community cultural programs. The Friends operate a used bookstore at the Boca Raton Public Library's Downtown location, with proceeds benefiting the library.
 The Boca Raton Public Library Board advises the City Council on the management and operation of the Boca Raton Public Library. Board members are appointed for three-year terms and meet monthly.

References

External links 
 City of Boca Raton Budgets Retrieved 2018-5-18
 United States Census Retrieved 2018-5-18

Public libraries in Florida
Buildings and structures in Boca Raton, Florida
Education in Palm Beach County, Florida
Tourist attractions in Palm Beach County, Florida
1923 establishments in Florida
Libraries established in 1923